Field Marshal Stapleton Cotton, 1st Viscount Combermere  (14 November 1773 – 21 February 1865), was a British Army officer, diplomat and politician. As a junior officer, he took part in the Flanders Campaign, in the Fourth Anglo-Mysore War and in the suppression of Robert Emmet's insurrection in 1803. He commanded a cavalry brigade in Sir Arthur Wellesley's Army before being given overall command of the cavalry in the latter stages of the Peninsular War. He went on to be Commander-in-Chief, Ireland and then Commander-in-Chief, India. In the latter role he stormed Bharatpur—a fort which previously had been deemed impregnable.

Career

1790–1805
Cotton was born at Lleweni Hall in Denbighshire, the second surviving son of Sir Robert Salusbury Cotton, 5th Baronet and Frances Cotton (née Stapleton). A quick, lively boy, he was known by his family as 'Young Rapid,' and was continually in scrapes. After three years in Audlem, he continued his education at Westminster School where he joined the fourth form under Dr. Dodd and his contemporaries included future soldiers Jack Byng, Robert Wilson and the poet Robert Southey. He was then sent to Norwood House, a private military academy in Bayswater, which was run by a Shropshire militiaman, Major Reynolds, an acquaintance of his father's. On 26February 1790, Cotton's father obtained for him a second-lieutenancy, without purchase, in the 23rd Regiment of Foot or Royal Welch Fusiliers, which he joined in Dublin in 1791. He was promoted to lieutenant in the 77th Regiment of Foot on 9 April 1791 and, having transferred back to the 23rd Regiment of Foot on 13 April 1791, he was promoted to captain in the 6th Dragoon Guards on 28 February 1793. He served with his regiment at the Siege of Dunkirk in August 1793 and at the Battle of Beaumont in April 1794 under the Duke of York during the Flanders Campaign. He became a major in the 59th Regiment of Foot on 28 April 1794 and commanding officer of the 25th Light Dragoons (subsequently 22nd) with the rank of lieutenant colonel on 27 September 1794.

In 1796 Cotton went with his regiment to India. En route he took part in operations in Cape Colony (July to August 1796), and on arrival was present at the Siege of Seringapatam in May 1799 during the Fourth Anglo-Mysore War, where he first met Colonel Arthur Wellesley, later the Duke of Wellington. He became commanding officer of the 16th Light Dragoons, then based in Brighton, on 18 February 1800. Promoted to colonel on 1 January 1800, he was posted with his regiment to Ireland in 1802 and took part in the suppression of Robert Emmet's insurrection in 1803. Promoted to major-general on 2 November 1805, he was given command of a cavalry brigade at Weymouth.

Peninsular War
Cotton was elected Member of Parliament for Newark in 1806. He was deployed to Portugal in April 1809 and commanded a cavalry brigade in Sir Arthur Wellesley's Army. Cotton was both courageous and also splendidly dressed in battle throughout the Peninsular War and was nicknamed the "Lion d' Or" ("Lion of Gold"). He took part in the Second Battle of Porto in May 1809 and the Battle of Talavera in July 1809 and, having succeeded to his father's baronetcy in August 1809, returned home to view his estate. He returned to Portugal in May 1810 and, having been promoted to the local rank of lieutenant-general and given overall command of the cavalry, fought at the Battle of Bussaco in September 1810 and then covered the withdrawal to the Lines of Torres Vedras later that year.

After fighting at the Battle of Sabugal in April 1811 and the Battle of Fuentes de Oñoro in May 1811, Cotton was promoted to the substantive rank of lieutenant-general on 1 January 1812. He took part in the Battle of Salamanca in July 1812, where he was second-in-command of the Army. During the engagement he successfully led a cavalry charge against Maucune's division, leading Wellington to exclaim, "By God, Cotton, I never saw anything so beautiful in my life; the day is yours." According to Wellington's subsequent despatch, "Cotton made a most gallant and successful charge against a body of the enemy's infantry which they overthrew and cut to pieces." At the end of the battle he was accidentally shot by a Portuguese sentry. In recognition of his gallantry he was appointed a Knight of the Order of the Bath on 21 August 1812 and an honorary Knight Grand Cross of the Portuguese Military Order of the Tower and Sword on 11 March 1813.

Cotton went on to fight at the Battle of the Pyrenees in July 1813, the Battle of Orthez in February 1814 and the Battle of Toulouse in April 1814. For these services he was raised to the peerage as Baron Combermere in the county palatine of Chester on 3 May 1814 and advanced to Knight Grand Cross of the Order of the Bath on 4 January 1815.

1815–1822

Cotton was not present at the Battle of Waterloo as the command of the cavalry had been given, at the insistence of the Prince Regent, to Lord Uxbridge, a more senior general. When Uxbridge was wounded Cotton took over his command and served with the Army of Occupation following the cessation of hostilities.

Cotton became Governor of Barbados and commander of the West Indian forces in March 1817. In the West Indies, Cotton's aide-de-camp was Sir Thomas Moody

Cotton is mentioned in unverified stories of the Chase Vault as being a witness to its allegedly "moving coffins" while serving as Governor of Barbados. Between 1814 and 1820, Cotton undertook an extensive remodelling of his home, Combermere Abbey, including Gothic ornamentation of the Abbot's House and the construction of Wellington's Wing (now demolished) to mark Wellington's visit to the house in 1820. He was appointed the last Governor of Sheerness in January 1821 and became Commander-in-Chief, Ireland in 1822.

1825–30

Having been promoted to full general on 27 May 1825 Cotton became Commander-in-Chief, India. In that role on 18January 1826, after a three-week siege, he stormed the capital of the Princely state of Bharatpur (also known as Bhurtpore) with its fort, which had previously been deemed impregnable, and restored the rightful raja to the throne. For his success in India he was raised in the peerage as Viscount Combermere on 8February 1827. On his return to England, he brought with him the 17.75-ton Bhurtpore gun, which for many years stood outside the Royal Artillery Barracks at Woolwich. He retired from active service in 1830.

Post 1850

He succeeded Wellington as Constable of the Tower and Lord Lieutenant of the Tower Hamlets in October 1852 and was promoted to field marshal on 2 October 1855. He was appointed a Knight of the Order of the Star of India on 19 August 1861.

Cotton also served as honorary colonel of the 20th Regiment of (Light) Dragoons, and of the 3rd (The King's Own) Regiment of (Light) Dragoons and then as honorary colonel of the 1st Regiment of Life Guards. He died at Colchester House in Clifton on 21 February 1865 aged 91 and was buried at St Margaret's Church, Wrenbury. An equestrian statue in bronze, the work of Carlo, Baron Marochetti, was raised in his honour at Chester by the inhabitants of Cheshire in October 1865. An obelisk was also erected in his memory on the edge of Combermere Park in 1890. Combermere was succeeded by his only son, Wellington Henry Stapleton-Cotton.

Slave ownership

According to the Legacies of British Slave-Ownership at the University College London, Combermere was awarded a payment as a slave owner in the aftermath of the Slavery Abolition Act 1833 with the Slave Compensation Act 1837. The British Government took out a £15 million loan (worth £ in ) with interest from Nathan Mayer Rothschild and Moses Montefiore which was subsequently paid off by the British taxpayers (ending in 2015). Combermere was associated with two different claims, he owned 420 slaves in Saint Kitts and Nevis and received a £7,195 payment at the time (worth £ in ).

Family

Combermere was married three times:

On 1 January 1801, Lady Anna Maria Clinton (d. 31 May 1807), daughter of Thomas Pelham-Clinton, 3rd Duke of Newcastle. They had three children:
 Robert Henry Stapleton Cotton (18 January 1802 – 1821)
 a son who died young
 another son who died young.
On 22 June 1814, Caroline Greville (d. 25 January 1837), daughter of Captain William Fulke Greville. They had three children:
 Wellington Henry Stapleton-Cotton, 2nd Viscount Combermere (1818–1891)
 Hon. Caroline Stapleton-Cotton (b. 1815), who in 1837 married Arthur Hill, 4th Marquess of Downshire
 Hon. Meliora Emily Anna Maria Cotton, who on 18 June 1853 married John Charles Frederick Hunter
In 1838, Mary Woolley (née Gibbings), by whom he had no issue.

References

Sources

Attribution

External links 
 
 
 

1773 births
1865 deaths
Knights Grand Cross of the Order of the Bath
Knights Companion of the Order of the Star of India
Lord-Lieutenants of the Tower Hamlets
Constables of the Tower of London
Members of the Privy Council of Ireland
Members of the Privy Council of the United Kingdom
British field marshals
British Army personnel of the French Revolutionary Wars
British Army commanders of the Napoleonic Wars
British Army personnel of the Peninsular War
British military personnel of the Fourth Anglo-Mysore War
British Commanders-in-Chief of India
Commanders-in-Chief, Ireland
People educated at Westminster School, London
Cotton, Stapleton
Viscounts in the Peerage of the United Kingdom
Governors of Barbados
Cotton, Stapleton
Cotton, Stapleton
Cotton, Stapleton
UK MPs who were granted peerages
Royal Welch Fusiliers officers
Carabiniers (6th Dragoon Guards) officers
16th The Queen's Lancers officers
3rd The King's Own Hussars officers
Peers of the United Kingdom created by George III
Peers of the United Kingdom created by George IV
Recipients of payments from the Slavery Abolition Act 1833
British slave owners